Matrix Telecom, Inc., operating as Matrix Business Technologies, Trinsic, Powered by Matrix, Excel Telecommunications and various other niche brands is a United States telecommunications firm that provides voice and data services to consumers and small and medium businesses as well as multi-location distributed enterprise markets (national chains). The firm also provides wholesale voice services to the telecommunications, wireless and cable industries.

Headquartered in Dallas, Texas with operations in Atmore, Alabama Matrix employs approximately 300 people. The company was founded in 1990.

Matrix is licensed as a facilities-based CLEC and long distance calling provider in 49 states and the District of Columbia (DC). In 1995, Matrix was recognized by Inc. Magazine as one of the fastest-growing private companies in the United States ranking #7 in the United States and #1 in the state of Texas and remained on the list the following year.

History

In 1999, Matrix was acquired by Platinum Equity, a global private investment firm specializing in M&A&O.

In 2001, Matrix integrated Staples Communications (Staples, Inc.) customers into its operations through an acquisition made by Platinum Equity, and with the purchase of Global Crossing’s Small Business Group in 2005, Matrix launched the Matrix Business Technologies brand to differentiate and focus its market presence between residential and commercial services.

Platinum Equity acquired the assets of Trinsic Communications (formerly Z-Tel) in June 2007 and integrated them into Matrix, This addition deepened the residential customer base within Matrix and broadened its national footprint of services. The brand was changed to "Trinsic, Powered by Matrix"

On March 16, 2010, Matrix announced it would acquire the customers and substantially all the assets of Dallas-based Excel Telecommunications.  That transaction closed on August 2, 2010, with the Excel headquarters in Irving, Texas becoming the new headquarters for the combined companies.

In addition to its own Veraz softswitch-based network, Matrix’s network partners include Global Crossing, Verizon Business, XO Communications, Paetec, Level 3), Covad, AT&T, Qwest, IBM and Intercall.

Services

Matrix offers include:
 Local Voice Service
 Long distance Voice Service
 Wholesale Switched Long Distance
 Wholesale Dedicated Long Distance
 Toll Free service
  Switched Toll Free
  Dedicated Toll Free
 Integrated Voice/Internet T1
 Dedicated T1
 IP VPN
DSL
Audio Conferencing
Web Conferencing

See also
List of United States telephone companies

References

External links
 Matrix Business Technologies website
 Trinsic Powered by Matrix website
 Excel Telecommunications website

Privately held companies based in Texas
Internet service providers of the United States
Telecommunications companies of the United States
Companies based in Dallas